is a Japanese free announcer, tarento, television presenter, newscaster, and actress. She is represented with Phonics. She is a former Fuji Television announcer from 1988 to 2000. She is the ambassador of Kanagawa Tourism.

Current appearances

As a freelancer

TV series

TV drama

Radio

Films

Advertisements

During her Fuji TV career

News and informal programmes
{|class="wikitable"
|-
! Year
! Title
! Notes
|-
|rowspan="2"| 1988 || 'FNN Super Time' || Weather caster
|-
|Otenki Channel ||
|-
| 1989 || FNN Morning Call || Monday and Tuesday appearances
|-
|rowspan="3"| 1990 || Konya wa Kōkishin! || Reporter
|-
|Antenna Hot 7 || Monday to Wednesday appearances
|-
|FNN Newscom || Friday appearances
|-
| 1991 || Professional Baseball News || Presenter
|-
| 1993 || Ohayō! Nice Day || Sunday appearances
|-
| 1994 || Mezamashi TV || Presenter
|-
| 1997 || Mezamashi TV Shumatsu-Go! || Presenter
|-
| 1998 || FNN Super News || Main caster
|}

TV variety

Video games

Bibliography

See also
Yūji Kuroiwa (Co-caster in Super News'')

References

External links

Japanese entertainers
Japanese television presenters
Japanese women television presenters
Waseda University alumni
1965 births
Living people
People from Yokohama